Antwerp Central is a Belgian feature film, which was screened at several film festivals in 2011 and received its world premiere in Montreal at the International Festival of Films on Art, where it won the 29th, FIFA Montréal, Winner Grand Prix. The film is written and directed by Peter Krüger.

Drawing inspiration from the book Austerlitz by W.G. Sebald the film is a historical, mildly ironic and contemplative look at the Central Station in Antwerp 
as a magical realistic location where past and present, history and daily life, fiction and reality are in constant flux. Running as a thread through the film are the dreams and reminiscences of a traveler, played by Johan Leysen, who arrives at Antwerp Central and through whose eyes we observe the station.

The film's cast includes Johan Leysen (traveler), and Thessa Krüger (little girl).

References

External links
 
 Official Official Trailer (YouTube) - Duration: 1 minute, 39 seconds
 Official Official Trailer (Vimeo) - Duration: 2 minutes, 44 seconds
 Official Official Website Antwerp Central 

2011 films
Belgian drama films
2010s French-language films
Docufiction films
Films set in Antwerp
Films set in Flanders
Films about architecture
2011 drama films
French-language Belgian films